Cretin may refer to:

 An archaic term for a patient with congenital iodine deficiency syndrome
 A pejorative term, similar to idiot
● Originally used to mean "a person who is deformed and mentally retarded as the result of a thyroid deficiency" (Butterfield).

Geography
 Cape Cretin, a headland on the Huon peninsula in Papua New Guinea

People
 Guillaume Crétin (c. 1460 – 30 November 1525), a French poet
 Joseph Crétin (1799–1857), an American bishop

Education
Some education institutions are named after bishop Joseph Crétin:
 Cretin Hall, one of the male undergraduate residence halls at the University of St. Thomas in Saint Paul, Minnesota
 Cretin-Derham Hall High School, a co-educational Catholic high school in Minnesota

Music
 "Cretin", song by Revocation from the album Chaos of Forms, 2011

See also 
 Parliamentary cretinism

References

Butterfield, Jeremy. Fowler's Concise Modern English Usage. Oxford University Press. 2016.